Andrew Charles Grammer (born December 3, 1983) is an American singer, songwriter, and record producer. He is signed to S-Curve Records.

His debut album, Andy Grammer, was released in 2011 and spawned the singles "Keep Your Head Up" and "Fine by Me". His second album Magazines or Novels was released in 2014, and featured "Honey, I'm Good" which is his most successful song to date, peaking at number 9 on the Billboard Hot 100. This single has been certified triple-platinum by the Recording Industry Association of America (RIAA) and was ranked one of the ten best-selling songs of 2015 by Nielsen SoundScan.
The Magazines or Novels album also featured the certified gold single "Good to Be Alive (Hallelujah)".

Personal life
Andrew Charles Grammer was born in Los Angeles, the son of Kathryn Willoughby and recording artist Robert Crane "Red" Grammer. He is of German and English descent. He grew up in Chester, New York and  graduated from Monroe-Woodbury High School. As a child, he learned to play the trumpet and later the guitar and piano. He began writing songs at 15. At 20, he left Binghamton University in Vestal, New York, and returned to Los Angeles, where he currently resides. In 2007, he graduated from the California State University, Northridge, with a B.A. in music industry studies.

While at college, Grammer met Aijia Grammer, whom he would marry in July 2012 in Fullerton, California. He and Aijia have two daughters: Louisiana K Grammer (born July 28, 2017) and Israel Blue Grammer (born April 3, 2020). He and Aijia adhere to the Baháʼí Faith.

Musical career

Grammer started as a busker on the Third Street Promenade in Santa Monica. He was discovered by his manager Ben Singer in July 2009 and signed with S-Curve Records in April 2010. Grammer's popular songs include: "Honey, I'm Good.", "Keep Your Head Up", "Fine by Me", "Fresh Eyes", "Good to Be Alive (Hallelujah)", and "Don't Give Up on Me".

His debut video "Keep Your Head Up", which featured actor Rainn Wilson, was an iTunes Video of the Week in 2010, and won MTV's "O Music Awards" for the most innovative video on April 25, 2011. He performed the song on The Rachael Ray Show on November 17, 2010. It has since debuted at No. 94 on the Billboard Hot 100 Grammer's debut album sales for the first week earned him the No. 1 spot on the Billboard Heatseekers Albums Chart. He opened for Plain White T's for the second leg of their "Wonders of the Younger" tour in the spring of 2011. In January 2011, he was named an "Artist to Watch" by Billboard magazine. He performed at SXSW 2011, playing BMI's Acoustic Brunch, where he was one of the artists contributing to a recording produced by Hanson to benefit the victims of the 2011 Japan earthquake.

Grammer credits his music influences to three genres of music: guitar players like Jason Mraz, John Mayer and Jack Johnson; modern pianists like Coldplay, The Fray, and OneRepublic; and hip-hop vocalists like Common, Lauryn Hill, Jay-Z, and Kanye West.

2011–2013: Andy Grammer
His debut album, Andy Grammer, was released on June 14, 2011, on S-Curve Records. The self-titled album was produced by Matt Wallace from Maroon 5, Matt Radosevich, Dave Katz, and Sam Hollander of Gym Class Heroes.

On the new album, Grammer said:

He joined Natasha Bedingfield on her Less is More Tour, which began June 2011, and Colbie Caillat on her US and Canada tour, which began August 2011. The Grammy Museum, in Los Angeles, featured him in the first installment of its homegrown local artist series starting in May 2011.

2014–2016: Magazines or Novels
On March 25, 2014, he debuted "Back Home", the lead single from his second album, Magazines or Novels. The song, co-written with Ryan Met from the group AJR, was released to iTunes on April 8, 2014. The album was released August 5, 2014.

On November 11, 2014, he released his biggest single to date, "Honey, I'm Good." which peaked at #9 on the Billboard Hot 100, and was certified triple-platinum by the RIAA.

On August 31, 2015, he was announced as one of the celebrities who will compete on the 21st season of Dancing with the Stars. He was paired with professional dancer Peta Murgatroyd until an ankle injury forced her to withdraw. His new partner was Allison Holker. Grammer and Holker were eliminated on Week 8 of competition and finished in 7th place.

In addition to his stint on the show, he released a new single "Good to Be Alive (Hallelujah)" on August 24, which was another gold-certified hit for him, and was included on a re-issued deluxe version of his Magazines or Novels album.

On October 27, 2015, he performed the National Anthem prior to the start of the opening game of the World Series between the Kansas City Royals and the New York Mets at Kauffman Stadium in Kansas City. In January 2016, he performed an a cappella version of "The Star-Spangled Banner" at the Denver Broncos–New England Patriots AFC Championship Game in Denver.

2016–present: The Good Parts and Naive
On July 29, 2016, Grammer released a new single titled "Fresh Eyes", which was another platinum hit for him that reach #19 on the Spotify Global Viral 50 Chart.

On June 9, 2017, Grammer released his new single featuring LunchMoney Lewis titled "Give Love". Grammer also wrote and performed the song "A Friend Like You" for the animated film Captain Underpants: The First Epic Movie.

The third single from his album The Good Parts, titled "Smoke Clears", was released on November 3, 2017. The album was released on December 1, 2017.

On February 21, 2019, Grammer released his new single, "Don't Give Up On Me", from the soundtrack of the film Five Feet Apart. It is also the lead single from his fourth studio album, Naive, which was released on July 26, 2019.

In March 2022, Grammer announced he had signed with Mushroom Publishing.

Discography

Studio albums

Extended plays

Singles

Promotional singles

Notes

Other appearances
Grammer made a guest appearance on the episode "SPARF-a-Rooney" of the Disney Channel series Liv and Maddie, performing the song "Honey, I'm Good."

Grammer also co-wrote Galantis's single, "Bones (feat. OneRepublic)."

References

External links

 
 

1983 births
Living people
American male singer-songwriters
Musicians from Los Angeles
21st-century Bahá'ís
American street performers
American Bahá'ís
American people of German descent
California State University, Northridge alumni
People from Chester, Orange County, New York
American male pop singers
American people of English descent
Singer-songwriters from California
American soul singers
21st-century American singers
21st-century American male singers
American pop rock singers
Singer-songwriters from New York (state)